Nathaniel R. Brazill (born September 22, 1986) is an American man who, at age 13, fatally shot one of his schoolteachers, Barry Grunow, at Lake Worth Middle School in Lake Worth, Florida. Brazill was subsequently convicted and sentenced to 28 years in prison.

Shooting and conviction
On May 26, 2000, the last day of the 1999–2000 school year, Brazill—a seventh grade student—shot and killed Barry Grunow, an English teacher at Lake Worth Middle School in Lake Worth, Florida. After being sent home from school earlier that day for throwing a water balloon, Brazill had returned home, retrieved a .25-caliber handgun, and shot Grunow. Brazill was tried as an adult and convicted of second-degree murder for the killing of Grunow and aggravated assault for pointing the gun at another teacher. The jury decided not to convict Brazill of first-degree murder, which requires premeditation and carries a mandatory life sentence in Florida, however, juveniles convicted of first-degree murder in Florida are given a review by a judge after 25 years. Brazill was sentenced to 28 years in state prison followed by 7 years of probation.

Subsequent civil litigation
Pam Grunow, the widow of the murdered teacher, sued the Brazill family friend that owned the handgun used, the Palm Beach County School Board, and the pawn shop that sold the handgun. These cases were settled for over $1 million. Grunow also filed an action against the gun manufacturer that resulted in a $1.2 million jury verdict, but the trial judge set aside the verdict, and in 2005 the Florida District Court of Appeals upheld this ruling.

Imprisonment
Brazill is incarcerated at the Jackson Correctional Institution with a release date set for May 18, 2028. While imprisoned, Brazill earned his GED and certification as a paralegal.

Childhood and student career

As a child, Brazill was surrounded by domestic abuse and alcoholism at home, and local police frequently responded to calls from the Brazill residence. Prior to the Grunow murder, however, Brazill received at least 2 D's as well as an F by Grunow himself, described by teachers as being mild mannered and likeable, and Grunow was his favorite teacher.

In popular culture
Nathaniel Brazil's murder of his teacher Barry Grunow was covered in the show Kids Who Kill. It was shown in the same episode as the murder of Derrick Robie by Eric Smith, and the murder and attempted murder by Daniel Petric.

References

External links
 Nathaniel Brazill Takes Stand in Murder Trial CNN.com - Transcripts (8 May 2001)

1986 births
Living people
2000 murders in the United States
21st-century African-American people
21st-century American criminals
American male criminals
American people convicted of assault
American people convicted of murder
Criminals from Florida
Male murderers
Minors convicted of murder
People convicted of murder by Florida
People from Lake Worth Beach, Florida